The Odzemek (in slovak Odzemok) is a Slovak solo traditional dance for men which always has an improvised character. The dance starts out slow and gets faster as the dance goes on, and is traditionally danced in Slovakia and also Moravian Wallachia. The name Odzemok comes from the words 'od zeme,' which means 'from the ground.'

Composers such as Antonín Dvořák composed these dances. The first dance from the Slavonic Dances Op. 72 is an odzemek.

References

European folk dances
Dance forms in classical music